Professional Building can refer to:
 Professional Building (Phoenix, Arizona), listed on the NRHP in Arizona
 Professional Building (West Palm Beach, Florida), listed on the NRHP in Florida
 Professional Building (Waterville, Maine), listed on the NRHP in Maine
 Professional Building (Kansas City, Missouri), listed on the NRHP in Missouri
 Professional Building (Raleigh, North Carolina), listed on the NRHP in North Carolina
Physicians and Dentists Building, also known as Professional Building, Philadelphia, Pennsylvania, listed on the NRHP in Pennsylvania
Working Benevolent Temple and Professional Building, Greenville, SC, listed on the NRHP in South Carolina
 Professional Building (Suffolk, Virginia), listed on the NRHP in Virginia